Ethiopian seasons consisted of Four  phases: ፀዳይ ( Tsedey )  (September –November ), Bega (Dec–Feb) and Belg (March–May)and kiremt ( Summer) ( Jun- August) . The most dry and  cold season is Bega, where Kiremt is extremely rainy season where 85% to 95% of food crops are produced

Types
Ethiopia has three distinct seasons that are locally known as "bega" (October to January), "belg" (February to May) and "kiremt" (June to September). The rainfall pattern is also named according to their rainfall distribution which does not encompass the southern and southern lowlands of the country, which have with bimodal period rainfall with rainfall periods from March to May and from September to November. As such, there are two cropping seasons in Bale Highlands: Ganna (March to June) and Bona (July to December) seasons.

Bega(Winter)
Bega is the dry season covering from December to January. Bega season is mostly associated with hot days and cool nights. It is frost in every morning accompanied by frost over most the Ethiopian Highlands areas.

Belg(spring)
Belg is short-period rainy season in most parts of Ethiopia except the southern and southern lowlands. Covering from March to May, the rainfall in this season is highly variable in time and space and high maximum temperature values are common.

In this season, adequate rain in March may have helped farmers to plant short cycle crops, such as barley, wheat and teff. In most parts of Somali Region experienced erratic and low rainfall during March, especially in southern parts of the region where pasture and water availability are already scarce. According to study based on the European Commission and World Food Programme, 490,000 MT of cereals (maize, sorghum and wheat) could be purchased on the domestic market for food aid operation in Ethiopia in 2002.

Kiremt(Summer)
Kiremt is the rainy season where 85% to 95% of food crops are produced. Covering from June to August, the season is marked by frequent rains and homogeneous temperatures mainly from June and August. The magnitude of the rainfall in this season is higher than other seasons in most parts of the country.

References

Climate of Ethiopia
Geography of Ethiopia